Rebibbia is a station on the Rome Metro, and is the northern terminus of line B. It was opened in 1990 and is situated along via Tiburtina in the Rebibbia district at the north-eastern extremity of Rome. Beside the station is the Rebibbia prison.

References

External links

ATAC site on this station

Rome Metro Line B stations
Railway stations opened in 1990
1990 establishments in Italy
Rome Q. XXIX Ponte Mammolo
Railway stations in Italy opened in the 20th century